Bishops Bridge is a locality in the cities of Cessnock and Maitland in the Hunter Region of New South Wales, Australia. At the 2021 Census, the population was 218, the median age was 43 and 92% born in Australia.

References  

Suburbs of City of Cessnock
Suburbs of Maitland, New South Wales
Towns in the Hunter Region